The Istana Kenangan (Jawi script: ايستان كنڠن; Remembrance Palace) which today houses the Perak Royal Museum, was a royal residence in Kuala Kangsar in Perak, Malaysia.

History
It was built in 1926 for Sultan Iskandar Shah by the Malay carpenter Enci Sepian from Bukit Mertajam, with the assistance of his sons Zainal Abidin and Ismail. The palace was previously known as the Valley Palace due to its location. The palace had been the official residence between 1931 and 1933. However, upon completion of Istana Iskandariah, the Istana Kenangan was used to host royal receptions and where the palace guests stayed.

Architecture
It is two storeys high with the top floor consisting of the bedchamber, family bedrooms and a dining hall. The ground floor was once used as the official royal office where its original floor was made out of solid wood. The wooden floor however had been replaced by marble.

See also
 List of tourist attractions in Perak
 List of museums in Malaysia

Further reading

External links 

Sultanate of Perak | Istana Kenangan

1926 establishments in British Malaya
Kuala Kangsar District
Museums in Perak
Residential buildings completed in 1926
20th-century architecture in Malaysia